Water to the Dead is an album by the gothic rock band Ego Likeness. Released in 2004 on Dancing Ferret Discs, the album takes a more rock approach to their established electronic sound. The name Water to the Dead was, like the band's name, taken from the book Dune by Frank Herbert.

The album also marks the beginning of the band's continuing work with photographer Lauren E. Simonutti.

Track listing
Water to the Dead
16 Miles
Above the Soil (Isabel's version)
Isabel
Mandala
The Breach
Hurricane
Axis
Traveling Son
Wolves
Wayfaring Stranger

Contributing Musicians
Justin Dingo Sabe (noise) Tim McCracken (keyboards), Adam Goode (bass), David O’Donnell (drums) Stu Lunn (guitar). Live contributions: Jenny Mettee (bass, cello), Jerome Lintz (drums)Cover art/ Photography: Lauren E. Simonutti
Additional art: Steven Archer

References

2004 albums
Ego Likeness albums